HD 210434 is a subgiant star in the equatorial constellation of Aquarius. According to the Bortle scale, an apparent magnitude of six means this star is faintly visible to the naked eye from dark rural skies. It is an estimated 630 million years old with 2.4 times the mass of the Sun.

References

External links
 Image HD 210434

Aquarius (constellation)
210434
K-type subgiants
8453
109466
Durchmusterung objects